Jasses is a commune in the Pyrénées-Atlantiques department in south-western France.

Geography

Location
Jasses sits east of the Gave d'Oloron river. On the opposite side of the river is Sus.

See also
Communes of the Pyrénées-Atlantiques department

References

Communes of Pyrénées-Atlantiques